"Angel" is a song recorded by the American singer Chaka Khan for her eleventh studio album, Funk This (2007). It was written by Wright James Quenton and Yvette Marie Stevens, and produced by Tammy McCrary, Jimmy Jam and Terry Lewis. The song was recorded at the Flyte Tyme Studios in Santa Monica, California, and was mixed by Jordan Young, with William "Doc" Powell playing the guitar and Luis Conte percussion.

"Angel" is a R&B ballad, which also contains elements of contemporary R&B and jazz music. Following the release of the song, "Angel" charted at number 26 on the Billboard Hot R&B/Hip-Hop Songs chart, and peaked at number 19 on the Billboard Bubbling Under Hot 100 chart.

Lyrical interpretation
According to Khan, the song is about "reminding people that we are all angels in spite of our flaws and what not. And that there is hope." An accompanying music video was directed by Khan (focusing mostly on Khan recording the song in the vocal booth).

Personnel
 Chaka Khan – lead vocals, backing vocals
 Bernie Grundman – mastering
 Matt Marrin – mixing and recording
 William "Doc" Powell – guitar
 Jimmy Jam – guitar
 Luis Conte – synthesizer
 Aaron Spears – drums
 Andrew Gouche – bass guitar
 James "Big Jim" Wright – keyboards

Charts

References

2007 songs
Chaka Khan songs
Contemporary R&B ballads
2000s ballads